Charles Luke (22 June 1915 – 1 January 1998) was an Australian rules footballer who played with Footscray in the Victorian Football League (VFL).

Luke, a forward, came to Footscray from Phillip Island. He played 13 of his 18 career games in 1937 and kicked at least two goals in each of his home and away season appearances that year. His final season tally, 44 goals, was enough to top Footscray's goal-kicking. He spent much of the 1939 season playing for Yarraville and transferred to Gippsland club Morwell the following year, as captain-coach.

References

External links
 

1915 births
1998 deaths
Australian rules footballers from Victoria (Australia)
Western Bulldogs players
Yarraville Football Club players
Morwell Football Club players